The Wilderness Trail is 1919 American silent Western film directed by Edward J. Le Saint and starring Tom Mix and Colleen Moore. It was one of the first of two films that featured Mix and Moore. The Wilderness Trail is based on the 1913 Western novel of the same name by Francis William Sullivan and was adapted for the screen by Charles Kenyon.

No prints of The Wilderness Trail are known to exist and the film is now presumed lost.

Plot
Set in the Northwoods of Canada, Tom Mix stars as Donald MacTavish, the newly appointed head commissioner of the Hudson's Bay Company. This promotion infuriates MacTavish's rival Angus Fitzpatrick (Frank Clark) who wanted the job. Angus Fitzpatrick takes his anger and resentment out on MacTavish then sets out to get MacTavish fired. Fitzpatrick accuses MacTavish of stealing furs that were actually stolen by a group of thieving traders led by Sergius (Sid Jordan). To complicate matters, both MacTavish and Sergius are in love with Fitzpatrick's young daughter Jeanne (Moore). After Sergius kidnaps Jeanne, Angus Fitzpatrick attempts to rescue his daughter but is injured by the thieving traders. MacTavish rescues Jeanne and the two return home to Angus Fitzpatrick. Fitzpatrick forgives MacTavish and the two work together to catch the group of thieving traders who kidnapped Jeanne.

Cast
 Tom Mix as Donald MacTavish
 Colleen Moore as Jeanne Fitzpatrick
 Frank Clark as Angus Fitzpatrick
 Lule Warrenton as Old Mary
 Sid Jordan as Sergius
 Pat Chrisman as Indian
 Jack Nelson as Half-Breed

Production notes
The Wilderness Trail was shot in and around Flagstaff, Arizona from February 3 to February 24, 1919. Interior shots were filmed in Los Angeles.

See also
 Tom Mix filmography

References

External links

 
 
 Sullivan, Francis William (1913). The Wilderness Trail. New York: W. J. Watt & Company, on the Internet Archive.

1919 films
1919 Western (genre) films
Fox Film films
American black-and-white films
Films based on American novels
Films based on Western (genre) novels
Films set in Canada
Films shot in Arizona
Films shot in California
Lost Western (genre) films
Lost American films
1919 lost films
Silent American Western (genre) films
Films directed by Edward LeSaint
1910s American films